Elegy are a Dutch power metal band, founded in 1986 in Eindhoven. Their music is characterized by the fusion of power and progressive metal, which made them the pioneers of the 'progressive power metal' subgenre. The band was plagued by a continuing changing roster, which counts in the current line-up only one founding member. Elegy have currently suspended any recording or live activity.

History
The band was formed in 1986 by guitarists Hank van de Laars and Arno van Brussel, who recruited the first stable line-up of Elegy with vocalist Chris Terheijden, bassist Martin Helmantel and Bert Burgers on drums. In 1986, the new band won a competition organized by the German magazine Metal Hammer and Polydor Records and recorded their first demo Metricide. After recording their second demo, Better Than Bells, the band had already become known enough to tour with Angel Witch, Paul Di'Anno’s Battlezone, Hellion and King Diamond. The following year came the first changes in the band: Ed Warby and Eduard Hovinga joined the band on drums and vocals. This line-up recorded a third demo called Elegant Solution.

In 1992 they recorded their first album (Labyrinth of Dreams) and ensured a contract with the German label Shark Records. The album was a success in Japan where it reached number 42 in the album charts. Soon after the release of the album in 1993, Ed Warby left the band to join Gorefest and drummer Serge Meeuwsen was hired for a Japanese tour, along keyboard player Ton van de Stroom. Back from Japan, Meeuwsen, van de Stroom and founding member Arno van Brussel left Elegy, to be replaced by drummer Dirk Bruinenberg and guitarist Gilbert Pot.

In the spring of 1994, Elegy released their second studio album, Supremacy, which received little promotion by their record label and was supported only by a small tour with Annihilator, Phantom Blue, The Gathering and Gorefest.

In the summer of 1995, the album Lost is presented to the public, with new keyboard player Gerrit Hager. But shortly before going on tour with Yngwie Malmsteen, Hovinga, Pot and Hager left the band.  At the same the German record company Modern Music, home of T&T and Noise Records, offered the band a lucrative contract.

The following year, vocalist Ian Parry (ex-Hammerhead) joined the band and recorded the EP Primal Instinct, which contains acoustic versions of old Elegy songs.

The album State of Mind saw the light in May 1997 with good reviews and sales, both in Europe and Japan. Elegy went on a European tour with the Finnish band Stratovarius to support the new album.

Chris Allister  joined on keyboards for the concept album Manifestation of Fear, released in the summer of 1998. The band co-headlined a European tour with American power metal band Kamelot the same year.

After the tour in 1999, Parry started his side-project Consortium with Bruinenberg on drums. At the end of the year founding member Henk van de Laars and Chris Allister left Elegy. French guitar virtuoso Patrick Rondat joined the band during the same year and recorded Elegy's eight album Forbidden Fruit, released on September 18, 2000 and well received by critics. Forbidden Fruit was the last album released for Modern Music, leaving the band without a recording contract for more than a year. Meanwhile, the band members worked on side-projects or as touring and session musicians

Two years later Elegy released Principles of Pain with the Spanish label Locomotive Records. Since then the band have not published any more albums and is currently on hiatus.

Ian Parry said in a 2012 interview that he would like to make one more Elegy album, if a record company would be prepared to invest in it. Guitar Player Henk van der Laars wrote an album full of songs but more effort is needed to get it ready.

Discography

Albums

 Demo 86 - (1986) Demo
 Better Than Bells - (1987) Demo
 Elegant Solution - (1988) Demo 
 Labyrinth Of Dreams - (1990) Demo 
 Labyrinth of Dreams (1992)
 Supremacy (1994)
 Lost (1995)
 Primal Instinct (EP) (1996)
 State of Mind (1997)
 Manifestation of Fear (1998)
 Forbidden Fruit (2000)
 Principles of Pain (2002)

Band members

Current members
Ian Parry - vocals (1995–present)
Patrick Rondat - guitars (1999–present)
Martin Helmantel  - bass (1987–present)
Bart Bisseling - drums (2002–present)

Former members
Henk van der Laars - guitars (1986–1999)
Arno Van Brussel - guitars (1986–1993)
Chris Terheijden - vocals (1986–1989)
Bert Burgers - drums (1986–1988)
Ed Warby - drums (1988–1993)
Eduard Hovinga - vocals (1990–1995)
Serge Meeuwsen - drums (1993)
 Ton van de Stroom - keyboards (1992–1993)
Dirk Bruinenberg - drums (1993–2002)
Gilbert Pot - guitars (1993–1995)
Gerrit Hager - keyboards (1995)
Chris Allister - keyboards (1998–1999)

Timeline

References

External links 
Encyclopaedia Metallum entry
Ian Parry/Elegy/Consortium Project website

Dutch power metal musical groups
Dutch progressive metal musical groups
Musical groups established in 1986
1986 establishments in the Netherlands
Musical quintets
Locomotive Music artists